Leonard Kalate (born 6 April 2000) is a Papua New Guinean swimmer. He competed in the men's 100 metre breaststroke event at the 2018 FINA World Swimming Championships (25 m), in Hangzhou, China.

References

2000 births
Living people
Papua New Guinean male swimmers
Male breaststroke swimmers
Place of birth missing (living people)